Per un amico ("For a Friend") is the second album from the Italian progressive rock band Premiata Forneria Marconi.
Released in 1972 by all the initial members of the group, it is considered their breakthrough album that put them on the map. The album remains popular among progressive rock fans throughout Italy and the group will usually still perform all tracks on the album today.

The album, still progressive at heart, additionally borrows influences from a variety of rock genres and subgenres. In an Allmusic review, Per un amico was lauded as a classic within the genre and deemed par to the work of the biggest progressive rock acts of the 1970s. Many of the songs from this album would appear either in their original form or re-recorded with vocals in English on PFM's English-language album Photos of Ghosts.

Composition and critical reception 
Per un amico is rooted within the progressive rock genre, yet includes elements of music ranging from avant-garde to hard rock. The lyrics in the album are also sung in Italian.

Robert Taylor, in an Allmusic review, gave the album a four-and-a-half stars out of five and a positive review. Deeming it, along with its predecessor, as a classic, he claimed that it was as fine as the music of major groups such as Genesis, Yes, or King Crimson, and concluded by saying "Always intelligent, but without pretension, this is progressive rock in its most literal definition".

Track listing

Personnel 

 Franco Mussida – vocals, electric & acoustic guitar, 12 string guitar, theorbo, mandocello
 Flavio Premoli – spinet, keyboards, Hammond organ, Minimoog, Mellotron, tubular bells, harpsichord, piano, vocals
 Mauro Pagani – flute, piccolo, violin, vocals
 Giorgio Piazza – bass, vocals
 Franz Di Cioccio – drums, percussion, vocals

All-Time Ranking
Rolling Stone listed the album at 19th in their "50 Greatest Prog Rock Albums of All Time" list.

References

Premiata Forneria Marconi albums
1972 albums
RCA Records albums